The Lanciafiamme Mod. 41 d'assalto was an flamethrower used by the Royal Italian Army during World War 2, The mod. 41 was meant to be an extremely light and compact flamethrower to equip paratroopers and Assault Engineers, The flamethrower remained in use even after the war until 1998.

Bibliography 

 Le armi della fanteria italiana nella seconda guerra mondiale , Nicola Pignato, Albertelli Ed., 1978.

References

Flamethrowers